The former Royal Air Force Germany (RAFG) was a command of the Royal Air Force and part of British Forces Germany.  It consisted of units located in Germany, initially as part of the occupation following the Second World War, and later as part of the RAF's commitment to the defence of Europe during the Cold War.  The commander of RAFG doubled as commander of NATO's Second Allied Tactical Air Force.

History

RAF Germany was established on 1 January 1959 through the renaming of the RAF's Second Tactical Air Force. The command remained based at RAF Rheindahlen with Air Marshal Sir John Edwardes-Jones continuing as its Air Officer Commanding. Flying operations were conducted from six airfields; four of these - Geilenkirchen, Laarbruch, Bruggen, and Wildenrath - were the so-called "Clutch" airfields built earlier in the decade with the other two, Jever and Gutersloh, having been occupied since the closing months of World War II. The command's stock of aircraft included the English Electric Canberra bomber, Hawker Hunter fighter-bomber, and the Supermarine Swift reconnaissance aircraft.

The command's number of airfields was reduced by one in 1961 when Jever was returned to the West German federal authorities, followed by Geilenkirchen in 1968 and consolidating operations to four stations. In between times, RAFG received a dedicated interceptor force with the arrival of 19 and 92 Squadrons from the UK with their English Electric Lightning's.

From 1969 RAFG began receiving new equipment befitting its place on the frontline of the Cold War, with the command also reorganising to support one aircraft type at each base. Laarbruch became RAFG's home to the Blackburn Buccaneer strike aircraft, operated by XV and 16 Squadrons. Bruggen received the McDonnell Douglas Phantom fighter-bomber operated by 14, 17, and 31 Squadrons, with Wildenrath taking the Hawker Siddeley Harrier and 3, 4, and 20 Squadrons. Gutersloh became home to the two Lightning squadrons where they were joined in 1970 by the Westland Wessex helicopters of 18 Squadron, while 25 Squadron provided defence for the three Clutch bases with the Bloodhound SAM. The exception to this arrangement was II Squadron, who operated their Phantoms in the reconnaissance role from Laarbruch. At this time the command gained another further squadron when the Communications Flight adopted the identity of 60 Squadron which had recently disbanded in the Far East. The AOC of RAF Germany at this time was Dambuster raid pilot Air Marshal Harold "Mick" Martin.

Further change came with the arrival of the SEPECAT Jaguar in 1975, with the three Bruggen squadrons all converting to the single-seat, twin-engined, strike aircraft, and was later joined there by 20 Squadron which moved over from the Harrier. II Squadron would also receive the Jaguar, albeit remaining at Laarbruch in its reconnaissance role.

In 1977 Wildenrath and Gutersloh swapped roles as 19 and 92 Squadrons converted to the Phantom - now redeployed in the air defence role - and moved to Wildenrath to take advantage of their new mounts longer range with 3 and 4 Squadrons and their Harriers moving east. 230 Squadron and their Westland Puma helicopters arrived at Gutersloh in 1980 to replace 18 Squadron, who disbanded in preparation to receive the new Boeing Chinook. After re-equipping, and seeing service in the Falklands War 18 returned in 1983 with both units providing support to the British Army of the Rhine.

In 1983 a new shape emerged in the skies over western Europe with the arrival of the Panavia Tornado strike aircraft into RAF Germany. Entering service with XV Squadron, it was only intended to equip the three Laarbruch-based units but ultimately replaced the Jaguar across the command, which also included 20 Squadron moving once more this time to Laarbruch. 1986 saw the arrival of IX Squadron at Bruggen as well as the end of the nuclear Quick Response Alert duty that RAFG had carried out since its formation. The Jaguar finally left RAF Germany in 1988 when II Squadron replaced theirs with Tornado's fitted with the much-delayed TIRRS system, while the following year 3 and 4 Squadrons began replacing their first-generation Harriers with the new Harrier II. 25 Squadron disbanded that October, ending nearly 20 years of Bloodhound SAM operation in Germany with the numberplate transferred the same day to a new Tornado F.3 unit at RAF Leeming.

The fall of the Berlin Wall and the collapse of the Warsaw Pact stimulated major changes in British defence policy and RAF Germany was no exception. The Options for Change paper announced a downsizing of the command; Wildenrath was to close and its Phantom squadrons disbanded, Gutersloh was to be transferred to the British Army and its squadrons relocated to Laarbruch which in turn would have its three strike/attack Tornado disbanded.

These proposals were quickly overtaken by events in the Gulf, following the Iraqi invasion of Kuwait. RAF Germany provided the bulk of the Tornado force with XV (Wg Cdr John Broadbent), 16 (Wg Cdr Ian Travers-Smith), and 31 (Wg Cdr Jerry Witts) providing the main elements at Muharraq, Tabuk, and Dhahran respectively, with personnel drawn from all eight RAFG Tornado squadrons. Three of those - Squadron Leaders Garry Lennox and Kevin Weeks from 16 Squadron and Flight Lieutenant Steve Hicks from XV Squadron - were Killed in Action and the last of over one hundred aircrew lost in service with RAFG units.

Despite the successful service in the Gulf, the Options for Change proposals were carried out. 92 Squadron at Wildenrath was the first to disband in July 1991, followed by 19 in January 1992 and the station itself that April. At Laarbruch both XV and 16 Squadrons were disbanded during 1991, and II Squadron relocated to RAF Marham. 20 Squadron remained but disbanded in July 1992, before 3, 4, and 18 Squadrons relocated from Gutersloh later that year while 230 Squadron had departed for RAF Aldergrove in Northern Ireland that April.

RAF Germany itself came to an end on 1 April 1993 when it was disbanded and redesignated as No.2 Group of Strike Command with Air Marshal Sandy Wilson as its last AOC. 2 Group was itself subsumed into 1 Group in 1996, with the final withdrawal of forces coming in 2002 following the closures of Laarbruch and Bruggen.

Flying units in 1989 
 Royal Air Force Germany, RAF Rheindahlen, doubles as commander of NATO's Second Allied Tactical Air Force
 4 Wing, administrative control of RAF Regiment Rapier squadrons based in West Germany
 33 Wing, administrative control of RAF Regiment Light Armour squadrons based in West Germany
 RAF Bruggen, FRG
 No. 9 Squadron, 12× Tornado GR.1note 1
 No. 14 Squadron, 12× Tornado GR.1note 1
 No. 17 Squadron, 12× Tornado GR.1note 1
 No. 31 Squadron, 12× Tornado GR.1note 1
 No. 37 Squadron RAF Regiment, (Air Defence, 8× Rapier launch stations)
 No. 51 Squadron RAF Regiment, (Light Armour, 15× Spartan, 6× Scorpion)
 RAF Gütersloh, FRG
 No. 3 Squadron, 16× Harrier GR.5
 No. 4 Squadron, 16× Harrier GR.5
 No. 18 Squadron, 16× CH-47 Chinook (supporting British Army of the Rhine)
 No. 230 Squadron, 16× Puma HC.1 (supporting British Army of the Rhine)
 No. 63 Squadron RAF Regiment, (Air Defence, 8× Rapier launch stations)
 RAF Laarbruch, FRG
 No. 2 Squadron, 12× Tornado GR.1A (Reconnaissance)
 No. 15 Squadron, 12× Tornado GR.1note 1
 No. 16 Squadron, 12× Tornado GR.1note 1
 No. 20 Squadron, 12× Tornado GR.1note 1
 No. 1 Squadron RAF Regiment, (Light Armour, 15× Spartan, 6× Scorpion)
 No. 26 Squadron RAF Regiment, (Air Defence, 8× Rapier launch stations)
 RAF Wildenrath, FRG
 No. 19 Squadron, 16x Phantom FGR.2
 No. 92 Squadron, 16x Phantom FGR.2
 No. 60 Squadron, Andover CC.2 transport planes
 No. 16 Squadron RAF Regiment, (Air Defence, 8× Rapier launch stations)

Note 1: Unit with nuclear strike role with 18x WE.177 tactical nuclear weapons.

RAFG Stations & Establishments

See also
 Royal Air Force
 List of Royal Air Force commands
 Royal Air Force station
 List of Royal Air Force stations
 List of former Royal Air Force stations
 RAF Regiment
 List of RAF Regiment units

References

External links
 Official web page listing current RAF stations
  RAF Winterberg website 
 Sir David Lee, The RAF in Germany 1945-78

Further reading
 Brookes, A. J. "The Royal Air Force in Germany changing for the better?" The RUSI Journal 139, no. 2 (1994): 22–85.
 

|-

Military units and formations established in 1959
Royal Air Force commands
 
British forces in Germany
 
Military units and formations disestablished in 1993

de:Fliegerhorst Oldenburg